This is a list of leaning towers. A leaning tower is a tower which, either intentionally or unintentionally (due to errors in design, construction, or subsequent external influence such as unstable ground), does not stand perpendicular to the ground. The most famous example is the Leaning Tower in Pisa, Italy.

Asia

China
 The Giant Wild Goose Pagoda of Xi'an
 The Huzhu Pagoda of Tianma Mountain near Shanghai
 The Huqiu Tower in Suzhou, Jiangsu
 The deliberately tilted Iron Tower of Yuquan Temple, Hubei
 Qianwei's Leaning Tower in Suizhong County, Liaoning
 Baoguang Temple's pagoda: only the top levels are tilted

Hong Kong
 The pair of towers of Hong Kong–Shenzhen Western Corridor

India
 Golden Pillar in Ettumanur temple
 The Leaning Temple of Huma, Sambalpur
 Ratneshwar Mahadev temple, Varanasi

Iraq
 The 12th century Great Mosque of al-Nuri in Mosul, destroyed in 2017.

Malaysia
 A clock and water tower in the Teluk Intan town in Perak

Philippines
 Bombon Parish Church Bell Tower

Sri Lanka
 Altair, one tower of twin skyscraper complex in Colombo

UAE
 Capital Gate, skyscraper in Abu Dhabi

Europe

Belgium
 The Belfry of Bruges
 The tower of Sts. Peter and Paul Church in Schelle
 The tower of the abbey church in Ninove

Czech Republic
 The tower of the Nanebevzetí Panny Marie church in Ústí nad Labem
 Church of Saint Peter of Alcantara in Karviná

Estonia
 Karski Church  in Karksi-Nuia
 Kiipsaare Lighthouse in Saaremaa

France
 La tour penchée, Oye-Plage, Pas-de-Calais

Germany

 Oberkirche in Bad Frankenhausen 
 The Metzgerturm in Ulm
 The Neuer Zollhof in Düsseldorf 
 The Reichenturm in Bautzen
 The Leaning Tower of Gau-Weinheim (lean 5.4277° on 15 July 2022, greater than Suurhusen)
 The Leaning Tower of Suurhusen, Schiefer Turm von Suurhusen. at an angle which was according to Guinness World Records in 2007 the greatest for an unintentionally tilted tower
 The Leaning Tower of Dausenau (Schiefer Turm von Dausenau) (slightly further leaning than the Tower of Suurhusen, disqualified by Guinness World Records for being a ruin instead of a tower)
 The 14th-century bell tower of the Church of Our Dear Lady in Bad Frankenhausen
 The 13th century tower in Kitzingen is distinctive for its crooked roof due to top floor being offset. This offset, due to town legend, was due to wine being used instead of water for the top floor during a serious drought.

Hungary
 Szécsény Firewatch Tower, leaning 3 degrees

Ireland

 The Round Tower of Kilmacduagh Monastery in Gort, County Galway

Italy

 The 
 The campanile (bell tower) of the Cathedral of Pisa (known as the Leaning Tower of Pisa), Pisa
 The campanile of Duomo di Portogruaro
 The campanile of San Giorgio dei Greci in Venice
 The campanile of San Martino church on the island of Burano, Venice
 The campanile of San Michele, Massino Visconti
 The campanile of San Michele degli Scalzi, Pisa
 The campanile of San Nicola, Pisa
 The campanile of Santo Stefano in Venice
 Torre delle Milizie, Rome
 The Two Towers (Asinelli and Garisenda towers in Bologna)

Netherlands

 The tower of the St. Walfriduskerk in Bedum
 The tower of the Oude Kerk in Delft
 The tower of the Grote Kerk of Dordrecht
 The Oldehove in Leeuwarden
 The tower in Miedum
 The Martinitoren in Groningen
 The tower of the Catharinakerk in Acquoy
 The tower of the Domkerk in De Lier
 The tower of the church in Loenen aan de Vecht
 The tower of Sint-Jan de Doper church in Waalwijk

North Macedonia
 Clock Tower in Prilep in North Macedonia

Poland
 The Krzywa Wieża (Leaning Tower) in Toruń
 The Krzywa Wieża (Leaning Tower) in Ząbkowice Śląskie
 The Baszta Sowia (Owl's Tower) in Pyrzyce

Romania
 The St. Margaret Evangelic church Tower in Mediaș
 The church tower of the Evangelic Church in Ruși-Slimnic

Russia
 The Demidov Tower in Nevyansk
 The Sobornaya Belltower in Solikamsk
 The Söyembikä Tower in Kazan
 Belltower of the Church of the Theotokos of Tikhvin in Kungur
 Belltower of the Edoma Pogost near Arkhangelsk
 Belltower of the Church of All Saints in Moscow

Serbia
 Church of St. Anthony of Padua in Zvezdara municipality, Belgrade

Slovakia
 The tower of the Church of Saint Martin in Vrbové in Slovakia is known as the "Slovak Pisa".
 The Church of Saint George in Spišská Sobota
 The Clock Tower on SNP Square in Banská Bystrica

Spain
 Mudéjar Tower of San Pedro del los Francos, Catalayud, Aragon
 The demolished Leaning Tower of Zaragoza, was, while it existed, the most famous Spanish leaning tower. Demolished in 1892.
 Mudéjar Clock Tower of Ateca, Aragon
 Gate of Europe, two mutually inclined skyscrapers in Madrid

Switzerland
 The Leaning Tower of St. Moritz, remaining bell tower of St. Mauritius Church (16th century) that was demolished in 1893.

Ukraine
 Belltower of Great Lavra in Kyiv
 Belltower of Saint Lawrence's Church in Zhovkva

United Kingdom
 2 Adelaide St (multi-purpose building with Bank of Ireland as anchor tenant), Belfast, Northern Ireland
 The Albert Memorial Clock in Belfast, Northern Ireland
 Bateman's Tower in Brightlingsea, Essex, England
 The great tower of Bridgnorth Castle, in the town of Bridgnorth, Shropshire, England
 The southeast tower of Caerphilly Castle, Wales
 The spire of the Church of St Mary and All Saints, Chesterfield
 The Greyfriars

North America

Canada
 The Olympic Stadium Tower, the tallest deliberately leaning tower, Montréal, Québec 
 The Saint-Léonard Tower (and associated public market), Saint-Léonard, Québec (demolished)

Mexico
 Puerto Morelos Lighthouse of 1946 on Riviera Maya in the state of Quintana Roo, leaning since 1967

United States

 The Leaning Tower of Niles, in Niles, Illinois; a replica of the Leaning Tower of Pisa
 The "Leaning Tower of Patchogue", a nickname given to the former PD Tower at the LIRR station in Patchogue, New York; it was demolished in 2006
 The Leaning Water Tower, in Groom, Texas
 The Leaning Tower of Dallas in Dallas, Texas, a now demolished core of a 11-story building that remained erect but slightly leaning after a building demolition. 
 The Millennium Tower in San Francisco; an examination in 2016 showed the building had sunk 16 inches, with a two-inch tilt towards the north west
 The Ocean Tower, in South Padre Island, Texas (demolished)
 Sharps Island Light, 3 miles off the southern end of Tilghman Island, in Maryland's Chesapeake Bay, has been leaning 15° since it was damaged by an ice floe in 1977

Oceania

Australia
 The Leaning Tower at the Gravity Discovery Centre in Gingin

New Zealand
 The Hotel Grand Chancellor, Christchurch (demolished in 2012 after the 2011 Christchurch Earthquake)
 The Leaning Tower at the Puzzling World in Wanaka

See also

Inclined building
Inclined tower
 Crooked spire

References

External links
Leaning Towers of China

Leaning